The European route E5 is part of the United Nations international E-road network. It is the westernmost north–south "reference road", running from Greenock in Scotland, south through Great Britain and France to Algeciras, Spain.

The E5 follows the route Greenock – Glasgow – Gretna – Carlisle – Penrith – Preston – Warrington – Birmingham – Oxford – Newbury – Southampton ... Le Havre – Paris – Orléans – Tours – Poitiers – Bordeaux – San Sebastián – Burgos – Madrid – Córdoba – Seville – Cádiz – Algeciras.

United Kingdom 

Although the United Kingdom Government participates fully in activities concerning the E-routes, E-routes are not signposted within the United Kingdom. Hence the first 724 km of the route is not signed.

The E5 has a gap at the English Channel between Southampton and Le Havre, France. There is no direct ferry link, but a ferry from nearby Portsmouth, along the M27, connects to Le Havre.

France 

The E5 arrives from the non-existing ferry from Southampton in Le Havre. It passes the capital Paris, before continuing southwest passed Orléans, Tours and Bordeaux. It ends at the border town of Hendaye with Spain. It covers a distance of 985 km (612 mi).

Spain 

The E5 crosses the French border at Irun, it passes the major cities of San Sebastián, Vitoria-Gasteiz and Burgos before it arrives at the nation's capital Madrid. It continues south of Madrid towards Andalusia, passing Córdoba, Seville, Jerez de la Frontera and Cádiz to end at the port city of Algeciras.

Route 

: Greenock – 
:  – Glasgow (Interchange with 
: Cannock –  OR : Birmingham Northern Relief Road (Whole length) (Interchange with )
: Birmingham
: Birmingham – Oxford
: Winchester – Southampton
Gap (English Channel)
 Southampton –  Le Havre

: Le Havre
: Le Havre – Tancarville
: Tancarville
: Tancarville – Bourneville
: Bourneville (Start of Concurrency with ) – Rouen (End of Concurrency with ) – Paris
Boulevard Périphérique: Paris (Towards )
: Paris – Massy
: Massy – Ablis – Orléans (Start of Concurrency with ) – Tours (End of Concurrency with ) – Poitiers – Niort – Saintes – Bordeaux
: Bordeaux (Start of Concurrency with )
: Bordeaux
: Bordeaux – Bayonne (Start of Concurrency with ) – Hendaye

: Irún – Donostia/S. Sebastián – Eibar (End of Concurrency with ) – 
: Eibar – Miranda de Ebro – Burgos
: Burgos (End of Concurrency with ) – Madrid
: Madrid
: Madrid – Manzanares – Bailén – Córdoba – Sevilla (Towards )
 Seville - Jerez de la Frontera - Cádiz
 Cádiz - Vejer de la Frontera
 Vejer de la Frontera - Tarifa - Algeciras

References

External links 
 UN Economic Commission for Europe: Overall Map of E-road Network (2007)
http://www.elbruz.org/eroads/E05.htm

05
5-0005E
5-0005E
E0005
5-0005E
E0005
5-0005E
5-0005E
5-0005E
5-0005E
5-0005E
5-0005E
5-0005E
5-0005E
5-0005E
5-0005E
5-0005E
5-0005E
5-0005E
5-0005E
5-0005E
Roads in the United Kingdom
05